Hornibrook and Hornabook are English language surnames. Notable people with these surnames include:

Hornabrook
Beta Hornabrook JP née Mary Elizabeth Cocking (c.1881– ), sat for Birmingham Deritend (UK Parliament constituency) in 1929
Charles Atkins Hornabrook (c. 1833–1903) hotelier in colonial South Australia
Charles Soward Hornabrook (1859–1922), Anglican priest in South Australia
Rupert Walter Hornabrook (1871–1951), Australian medical doctor and specialist anaesthetist

Hornibrook
Alex Hornibrook (born 1997), American football quarterback
Manuel Hornibrook (1893–1970), Australian civil engineer
Percy Hornibrook (1899–1976), Australian cricketer
Selina Hornibrook (born 1978),  Australian netball player
William H. Hornibrook (1884–1946), US diplomat

See also
Hornbrook (surname)
Hornibrook Bridge, toll bridge of Brisbane, Australia (demolished)
Hornibrook Bus Lines, a bus operator of Brisbane, Australia